Qosbeh may refer to:
 Qosbeh-ye Maniat
 Qosbeh-ye Nassar

See also
 Qasabeh (disambiguation)